Fools in the Dark is a 1924 American silent comedy film directed by Alfred Santell and starring Patsy Ruth Miller, Matt Moore and Bertram Grassby.

Cast
 Patsy Ruth Miller as Ruth Rand
 Matt Moore as Percy Schwartz / Percy Primrose
 Bertram Grassby as Kotah - Dr. Rand's Servant
 Charles Belcher as Dr. Rand
 Tom Wilson as 	Diploma' - Percys Black Valet
 John Steppling as Julius Schwartz

References

Bibliography
 Connelly, Robert B. The Silents: Silent Feature Films, 1910-36, Volume 40, Issue 2. December Press, 1998.
 Munden, Kenneth White. The American Film Institute Catalog of Motion Pictures Produced in the United States, Part 1. University of California Press, 1997.

External links
 

1924 films
1924 comedy films
1920s English-language films
American silent feature films
Silent American comedy films
Films directed by Alfred Santell
American black-and-white films
Film Booking Offices of America films
1920s American films